Back strain is the injury occurring to muscles or tendons. Due to back strain, the tendons and muscles supporting the spine are twisted or pulled. Chronic back strain occurs because of the sustained trauma and wearing out of the back muscles. Acute back strain can occur following a single instance of over stressing of back muscles, as in lifting a heavy object. Chronic back strain is more common than the acute type.

To avoid back strain it is important to bend the knees whenever you lift a heavy object – see partial squats.

Signs and symptoms
The pain over the back is localized and does not radiate into the leg. It occurs suddenly and may be accompanied by muscle spasms. The pain is dull, aching type and decreases on rest. It may be aggravated with activity.

Cause
Back strain occurs more in women than men and is more common after pregnancy. Lean people, those standing for long hours and those doing sedentary work in bad posture are prone to back strain. Back strain is also more common in people with excessive curving of the back, weak muscles (as in muscular dystrophies) and tight thigh muscles. People who play sports involving lifting heavy weights, pushing and pulling are also prone to back strain.

Diagnosis
The diagnosis of mild back strain can be made with a medical history and physical examination. In case of more severe strains, an X-ray should be taken to rule out fracture and disc herniation.

Treatment
Back strain is treated using analgesics such as ibuprofen, rest and use of ice packs. The patient can resume activities 24–48 hours after pain and swelling is reduced. It is not recommended to have prolonged immobilization or bed rest. If the pain does not subside in two weeks, additional treatment may be required. 
Prevention of back strain is possible by adopting proper body mechanics while sitting, standing and lifting. Cessation of smoking, maintaining a healthy diet, exercise and normal weight is also good for preventing back strain. Temporary pain relief may be achieved through application of a menthol-based pain relief cream.

References

Orthopedic problems
Human back
Pain